Salma Okonkwo (born 8 July 1970), is a Ghanaian entrepreneur and business executive in the Energy industry. She is the founder of Blue Power Energy, an alternative energy conglomerate developing solar farm projects in Ghana.

Early life and education 
Salma Okonkwo (Iddrissu) was born in Accra, Ghana in 1970. She studied at Mfantsiman Girls' Senior High School and graduated from Loyola Marymount University in Los Angeles, California.

Business career 

After Okonkwo's return from California to Ghana in 2003, she was hired by Sahara Energy.

Okonkwo established UBI Energy, an energy trading business specialising in procurement and distribution of petroleum products in West Africa, in 1997. In 2013, Puma Energy acquired a 49% stake in UBI Group.

Identifying renewables as a better long-term alternative for Africa led her to begin a new venture with the solar-focused Blue Power Energy.

Salma Okonkwo continues to advocate for increased investment in Africa's energy sector, citing the industry as critical for the continent's post-COVID economic recovery, as well as identifying a problem in the lack of representation in local African founders, and female founders. In 2021 in celebration of Women's History Month, the Cherie Blair Foundation mentioned Salma Okonkwo in a list of women entrepreneurs, founders, leaders and changemakers.

In September 2022, Salma led a panel on a fair energy transition at the Clinton Global Initiative.

Honours 
In recognition for her contribution to Ghana's energy sector, Okonkwo was awarded the Woman of Excellence award at the fifth Ghana Women of Excellence Awards.

She was awarded at the Ghana Energy Awards 2019 as the Female Energy Personality of the Year.

References 

21st-century Ghanaian businesswomen
21st-century Ghanaian businesspeople
Living people
1970 births
Renewable energy